Anastasiya Olegovna Miroshnichenko (born 30 March 2004) is an Uzbek artistic gymnast.  She represented Uzbekistan at the inaugural junior World Championships.

Early life
Miroshnichenko was born in Fergana, Uzbekistan.  She began training in gymnastics in 2008 and joined the national team of Uzbekistan in 2013.

Gymnastics career

Junior

2017
Miroshnichenko made her international debut at the Republican Open Competitions in Minsk where she placed first in the all-around, on vault, and on floor exercise and won bronze on the uneven bars.  She next competed at the junior Asian Gymnastics Championships.  She placed 10th in the all-around, fifth on uneven bars and floor exercise, and seventh on vault.  She next competed at the 2017 Voronin Cup where she won bronze in the all-around behind Russians Aleksandra Shchekoldina and Vladislava Urazova.  Additionally she placed fourth on vault and uneven bars, sixth on floor exercise, and seventh on balance beam.

2018–19
Miroshnichenko began the 2018 season competing at the President's Cup in Almaty.  She won gold in the all-around, vault, and balance beam, won silver on the uneven bars, and placed fifth on floor exercise.  She next competed at the 2018 Junior Asian Championships where she placed seventh in the all-around and fourth on vault and uneven bars.

In June 2019 Miroshnichenko competed at the inaugural Junior World Championships alongside Dildora Aripova and Anna Silnova.  Miroshnichenko finished 33rd in the all-around and was the highest placing Uzbek gymnast.  She placed 15th on vault during qualification but did not advance to the event final.

Senior

2021
Miroshnichenko turned senior in 2020; however the mass majority of competitions were either canceled or postponed due to the global COVID-19 pandemic.  She made her senior international debut at the Varna Challenge Cup where she finished fourth on vault behind Coline Devillard, Uliana Perebinosova, and compatriot Oksana Chusovitina.  In October Miroshnichenko competed at the South Central Asian Championships alongside Dildora Aripova, Giunaz Jumabekova, and Ominakhon Khalilova.  They finished first as a team and individually Miroshnichenko won the all-around title.  She also qualified to three event finals.  During event finals Miroshnichenko won gold on vault and floor exercise and won silver on uneven bars behind Aripova.

2022
In January Miroshnichenko injured her cervical vertebrae while training.  She was out for the remainder of the season to focus on recovery and rehabilitation.  In May she was awarded Master of Sports of International Class.

Competitive history

References

External links
 

2004 births
Living people
Uzbekistani female artistic gymnasts
People from Fergana
21st-century Uzbekistani women